Scouting for Food is an ongoing annual program of the Boy Scouts of America, begun in 1985 by the Greater Saint Louis Area Council. The program involves collecting for local food banks. It is organized at the local level throughout the country.

Scouting for Food is a project rooted in the very foundation of the Scouting movement and its dedication to implement the Scout Slogan and do a good turn daily.

In some areas, the drive is called "Food for Families," or "Canning Hunger."

Background
Each year, local Cub and Boy Scouts leave plastic bags for their neighbors soliciting canned food items. One week later, the Scouts return to pick up and deliver the bags of food to a local food bank.
The donations will usually be delivered directly to the local food bank that day. The annual collection is usually done during the month of November.

References

External links
 

Boy Scouts of America
Charity events in the United States
Food banks in the United States